Metagentiana is a genus of flowering plants belonging to the family Gentianaceae.

Its native range is Central and Southern China to Northern Indo-China.

Species:

Metagentiana alata 
Metagentiana australis 
Metagentiana eurycolpa 
Metagentiana expansa 
Metagentiana gentilis 
Metagentiana leptoclada 
Metagentiana melvillei 
Metagentiana primuliflora 
Metagentiana pterocalyx 
Metagentiana rhodantha 
Metagentiana serra 
Metagentiana villifera

References

Gentianaceae
Gentianaceae genera